Barbara J. Goodwin (born January 25, 1949) is a Minnesota politician and former member of the Minnesota Senate. A member of the Minnesota Democratic–Farmer–Labor Party (DFL), she represented District 41, which included portions of Anoka, Hennepin, and Ramsey counties in the northern Twin Cities metropolitan area.

Early life, education, and career
Goodwin attended North Hennepin Community College in Brooklyn Park, Minnesota, then went on to Hamline University in St. Paul, Minnesota, receiving her B.A. with numerous honors in Sociology and Political Science.

Goodwin served on the Columbia Heights School Board from November 2009 until becoming a member of the Senate, and has also served as an adjunct professor at the Hamline University Graduate School of Business in Saint Paul from 2008 until 2010, teaching legislative practice and government contracting.

Minnesota Legislature
On June 1, 2010, Goodwin filed as a DFL candidate for the Minnesota Senate representing District 50.  The district includes the cities of Arden Hills, Columbia Heights, Fridley, Hilltop, New Brighton, Shoreview and St. Anthony and is divided between Anoka and Ramsey Counties.  On June 28, 2010, the district committee voted to revoke the endorsement from embattled incumbent Senator Satveer Chaudhary and grant it to her. She defeated Chaudhary in the August 10, 2010, DFL Primary, garnering 70% of the vote to Chaudhary's 30%. She subsequently won the November 2, 2010, General Election, garnering 52% to Republican Gina Bauman's 41% and Independent Rae Hart Anderson's 6%.

Goodwin was re-elected to District 41 in 2012, receiving 62.82% of the vote and defeating Republican candidate Gina Bauman.

Goodwin previously served as a member of the Minnesota House of Representatives from 2001 to 2007. While in the House, she specialized in state budget issues, consumer protections, homeowner construction and repair protections, jobs, education, health care and business and labor issues. She also supported expanded transit options.

Her special legislative concerns include jobs, budget, consumers, and health care. Goodwin encountered controversy when she was quoted in the Minneapolis Star Tribune as saying that although she supports gay marriage, she is uncomfortable about moving so quickly to legalize it in Minnesota.

Goodwin did not seek re-election in 2016.

Personal 
Goodwin lived in Columbia Heights from 1991 - 2019. She was born in NE Mpls. She has two adult children. Her son, Anthony David Goodwin is married to Katie Lucas and her daughter Heather Jo Bronder. She also has a  grandson Liam David. She and Bill Heaney, originally from Duluth, are married.

References

External links 

 Project Votesmart Profile: Senator Barb Goodwin

Democratic Party members of the Minnesota House of Representatives
Women state legislators in Minnesota
Living people
1949 births
21st-century American politicians
21st-century American women politicians